Sladen Peltier is a Canadian actor. He is most noted for his performance in the film Indian Horse, for which he was nominated for Best Supporting Actor at the 6th Canadian Screen Awards in 2018.

Peltier currently resides in Ottawa, Ontario and is from Wiikwemkoong Unceded Reserve located on Manitoulin Island in Ontario. He was cast in the film, his first ever acting role, after responding to a casting announcement looking for First Nations children who could skate. He has also appeared in supporting parts in the films It Chapter Two and Run Woman Run.

References

External links
 

Canadian male child actors
Canadian male film actors
First Nations male actors
Male actors from Ontario
People from Manitoulin Island
Ojibwe people
Living people
Year of birth missing (living people)